Your Name is Justine is a 2005 Luxembourgish film directed by Franco de Peña. De Peña had originally wanted to produce the film in Germany, but when he was unable to garner enough funds, he came to Luxembourg. The film was co-produced by Luxembourg Hemisphere Films and Polish Opus Film, and shot primarily in Luxembourg with the aid of numerous local technicians. As a result of the multifaceted production, the dialogue of the movie is in English, German and Polish. The plot of the story revolves around a girl called Mariola (Anna Cieslak), who is forced into prostitution in Berlin, and attempts to hold on to her sense of self despite being exploited by those around her.

The film was Luxembourg's submission to the 79th Academy Awards for the Academy Award for Best Foreign Language Film. Although previous submissions (such as Italy's Private) had been rejected due to not being in the official language of the country, the Academy removed the requirement for the 79th Academy Awards, allowing Your Name is Justine and other films such as Canada's Water (which contained only Hindi dialogue) to be submitted. However, the film was rejected by the Academy of Motion Picture Arts and Sciences before the formal review process. The Academy determined that there was not enough creative contribution from Luxembourg to qualify under the Academy's requirements, which stress that a "submitting country must certify that creative talent of that country exercised artistic control of the film." Joy Hoffman, the head of Luxembourg's foreign-language Oscar committee, was disappointed by the rejection. Although he accepted the notion that the film was a "borderline entry", he noted that "without Luxembourg the film wouldn't exist".

Plot 

While living with her grandmother in Poland, a young woman, Mariola (Anna Cieslak) falls in love. Her boyfriend, Artur (Rafal Mackowiak) is charming and suggests they travel around Europe and work here and there to pay for their trip. Unfortunately, Artur isn't as he seems and Mariola is sold as a prostitute when they cross over to Germany. We follow her ordeal as she tries to free herself and to stay sane as time goes by and her captors try to break and condition her to a new life of servitude.

Cast
 Anna Cieslak as Mariola
 Arno Frisch as Niko
 Rafal Mackowiak as Artur
 Mathieu Carrière as Gunter
 Dominique Pinon as Oncle Goran
 Katarzyna Cygler as Ola
 Małgorzata Buczkowska as Hania
 Barbara Walkówna as Barbara Szymanska, Mariola's Grandmother
 Maciej Kozłowski as Abattoir Examiner
 Mariusz Saniternik as Drunkard
 Grzegorz Piórkowski as Priest
 Jale Arıkan as Nadenka
 David Scheller as Yurij
 Franck Sasonoff as Oman
 Elizabeth Bruck as Helena
 Nedjad Kurtagic as Bouncer
 Jean-Marc Calderoni as Client
 Frédéric Frenay as Body Builder
 Anna Pachnicka as Prison Guard
 Denis Delic as Niko (Voice)

See also

Cinema of Luxembourg
List of submissions to the 79th Academy Awards for Best Foreign Language Film

References

External links

 :pl:Anna Cieślak

2005 films
English-language Luxembourgian films
English-language Polish films
Films about prostitution in Germany
Films about human trafficking
Works about sex trafficking